Titus Kent was an enslaved person in colonial Suffield, Connecticut, by Elihu Kent (1733–1814), and he was the father of Titus Gay, who is commonly referenced in legend, lore, and historical records as "Old Ti." Titus Kent served in the American Revolution with the Connecticut militia. He served with his owner, Elihu Kent, and with others from Suffield, Connecticut. 

Titus Kent served in the 3rd Connecticut Regiment in the Connecticut Line, Colonel Samuel Wyllys commanded, serving under General Samuel Holden Parsons. His regiment served in the New York area throughout the remainder of its service.

Suffield made up about one third of the Connecticut militia.  There was no official town militia, every town contributed to the Connecticut militia while possibly dividing up into different platoons, regiments, etc., based on location.  Initially, slaves were discouraged from enlisting in the Continental Army. The Continental Congress was trying to appease the southern states. Nevertheless, England offered freedom to slaves who fought for their side. Therefore, Congress relented and did the same in order to keep a balance.  Other slaves became part of the war everywhere.

References 

18th-century American slaves